Quanzhou East railway station is a railway station in Fengze District, Quanzhou, Fujian, China. It is on the Zhangping–Quanzhou–Xiaocuo railway.

History
The station opened in 1998. Passenger service ended on 9 December 2014. It has since been used for freight but is expected to close completely following the completion of the Xingguo–Quanzhou railway.

See also
Quanzhou railway station

References 

Railway stations in Fujian
Railway stations in China opened in 1998